Ortholepis polyodonta is a moth of the family Pyralidae. It was described by Boris Balinsky in 1991 and is found in South Africa.

References

Endemic moths of South Africa
Moths described in 1991
Phycitini